Anthony Wynn (born 1962, Eugene, Oregon) is an American author of Conversations at Warp Speed and co-author of Remember With Advantages: Chasing "The Fugitive" and Other Stories from an Actor's Life, and as playwright authored Bernard and Bosie: A Most Unlikely Friendship.

Playwright
Wynn's two-act, two-actor drama Bernard and Bosie: A Most Unlikely Friendship, explores the complex relationship between playwright George Bernard Shaw and poet Lord Alfred "Bosie" Douglas.  It is based on correspondence exchanged between the two men in the 1930s and early 1940s.  Having met in-person only once, the two—while from the absolute opposite ends of the spectrum—manage to connect and form a friendship.  The play debuted in London, United Kingdom and has been performed in Sarasota, Florida, Lexington, Kentucky, and New York.

Published works
Wynn is co-author (with Barry Morse and Robert E. Wood) of the books Merely Players - The Scripts (2003), and Pulling Faces, Making Noises: A Life on Stage, Screen and Radio (2004), the autobiography of actor Barry Morse.

He edited Stories of the Theatre (with Robert E. Wood), published in 2006; the material in the book combines the drama, tragedy and comedy of theatrical history with tales of actors, actresses, playwrights and critics.  He also wrote the foreword to the 2006 hardbound edition of the classic novel The Green Carnation by Robert Hichens (which was based on Hichens' personal relationships with Oscar Wilde and Bosie Douglas).

The theatrical memoir of actor Barry Morse, Remember With Advantages: Chasing "The Fugitive" and Other Stories from an Actor's Life (co-written with Robert E. Wood and Barry Morse), was released in 2007 by McFarland and Company publishers of North Carolina.  Academy Award-winning actor Martin Landau wrote the foreword for the book.  Wynn and Robert E. Wood also co-wrote Valiant for Truth: Barry Morse and his Lifelong Association with Bernard Shaw (2012) based on lectures they gave to the International Shaw Society and the Shaw Society of England, in London.

Wynn's compilation of interviews with actors and other professionals associated with the various incarnations of Star Trek entitled Conversations at Warp Speed was published in 2012. Interviewees included in the book are:  George Takei, Nick Tate, Grace Lee Whitney, Robin Curtis, Eric A. Stillwell, Armin Shimerman, Kitty Swink, Paul Carr, James Doohan, Bibi Besch, Gene Roddenberry, and Star Trek fans Marlene Daab and Carol Jennings.  The book includes three bonus interviews with Corinne Orr, Gretchen Corbett, and Barry Morse.  Morse also penned the foreword to the book prior to his death.

He co-authored The Wit and Wisdom of Barry Morse, with Robert E. Wood.  The volume is a compilation of notable and witty comments and quotations - sometimes dubbed 'Barry-isms' - recorded over the course of the actor's long career in show business.  As Morse once wryly noted: "My dearest enemies will say that I'm a sort of circus horse; that it's all done by numbers. But a trick is the name given to technique by people who haven't got any."

Science fiction fandom
In the 1970s and early 1980s, Wynn served on the Command Staff of Starfleet: The International Star Trek Fan Association as the Chief of Fleet Communications and as the titular editor of the Communique, created and published by Eric A. Stillwell.  In 1983, he left to found another Star Trek fan organization, Trek International, a group that ultimately boasted some thirty chapters worldwide.  Wynn also served as editor of that organization's publication, The Fleet Herald, throughout his tenure with the group.  Trek International survived for about six years before disbanding; many of the chapters merged into Starfleet.  The Guinness Book of World Records now recognizes Starfleet as the world's largest science fiction fan club.

Producer
As producer, he has brought the drama Blasphemy, starring Cil Stengel, to the Portland, Oregon stage and also he also co-produced two separate productions of A.R. Gurney's hit Broadway play Love Letters. Wynn also produced the world premiere of Doug Grissom's one-act drama Contact starring Ryan Case and Barry Morse. Other live events he has produced include An Evening of Song With Nichelle Nichols, The Star Trek Anniversary Celebration with Robin Curtis and Paul Carr, and Out on Broadway with Grethe Cammermeyer.

He has produced and worked on many multiple productions of the Barry Morse one-man show Merely Players throughout the U.S. and Canada, partly based on material found in the book Stories of the Theatre.

Wynn also formulated and co-produced the 60-minute audio drama Rogues and Vagabonds - A Theatrical Scrapbook. The piece is introduced by Tobias Andersen and stars Barry Morse. It featured fresh performances from the pages of theatrical history, including: The Man Who Killed Lincoln, Charles Dickens: Would-Be Actor, David Garrick: An Ideal Actor, plus performances based on works by Shakespeare (Hamlet), and George Bernard Shaw. Rogues and Vagabonds debuted on internet radio KSAV in 2007 and was released on compact disk in 2013.

He produced two music albums for entertainer and actress Grace Lee Whitney: Light at the End of the Tunnel in 1996, and Yeoman Rand Sings! in 1999. These releases included a number of her classic recordings, such as Charlie X, Miri, Enemy Within, and USS Enterprise.

Personal life 
In 2016, Wynn married artist Adrian Flores in a ceremony held in Yachats, Oregon. He resides in Central Texas.

Bibliography
 The Wit and Wisdom of Barry Morse (CreateSpace, 2013), 
 Conversations at Warp Speed (BearManor Media, 2012), 
 Valiant for Truth: Barry Morse and his Lifelong Association with Bernard Shaw (Lulu Press, 2012), 
 Remember With Advantages (McFarland and Company, 2007), 
 Stories of the Theatre (Lulu Press, 2006), 
 The Green Carnation, Foreword by Anthony Wynn (Lulu Press, 2006), 
 Everything Yet to Be (Lulu Press, 2005), 
 Pulling Faces, Making Noises (Writer's Club Press, 2004), 
 Merely Players - The Scripts (Writer's Club Press, 2003),

References

External links
 Anthony Wynn website
 Anthony Wynn at Author's Den
 Barry Morse-related books co-authored by Anthony Wynn

1962 births
Living people
American LGBT writers
Writers from Eugene, Oregon
Writers from Portland, Oregon
American male writers
Writers from Oregon
Winston Churchill High School (Eugene, Oregon) alumni
21st-century American LGBT people